A "meet-me room" (MMR) is a place within a colocation centre (or carrier hotel) where  telecommunications companies can physically connect to one another and exchange data without incurring local loop fees. Services provided across connections in an MMR may be voice circuits, data circuits, or Internet protocol traffic.

An MMR provides a safe production environment where the carrier handover point equipment can be expected to run on a 24/7 basis with minimal risk of interruption. It is typically located within the data center.
 
To interconnect, companies order a patch from their cage or suite to the MMR, and then arrange for the organization running the facility to connect them together. These physical connections may be an optical fiber cable, coaxial cable, twisted pair, or any other networking medium.

Typically, a meet-me room will discourage or disallow customers from installing large amounts of equipment.  However, multiplexing equipment is often welcome in the meet-me room, so that a customer can have a single connection between the room and the rest of their equipment in the building, and the multiplexing equipment can then break that out to allow for direct, private connections to several other organizations present in the meet-me room.

An Internet exchange point can also be present in a meet-me room to allow many organizations in the meet-me room to interchange traffic without having to make physical interconnections between every possible pair of organizations.

Examples
 One Wilshire: Los Angeles, California
 Westin Building: Seattle, Washington
 MAE-West (located in Market Post Tower): Downtown San Jose, California
 60 Hudson St, New York
 111 Eighth Ave, New York
 Infomart: Dallas, Texas
 350 E. Cermak Rd: Chicago
 165 Halsey Street, Newark, New Jersey

References

Internet hosting
Internet architecture
Internet exchange points
Telecommunications infrastructure